Hanoch Piven (born August 21, 1963 in Montevideo, Uruguay) is an Israeli mixed media artist best known for his celebrity caricatures.

History
Piven was born in Uruguay and moved to Israel with his family at the age of eleven. He grew up in Ramat Gan. He studied at the School of Visual Arts in New York, graduating in 1992. When he returned to Israel in 1995, he began to work for Haaretz newspaper.

Artistic career
Piven's illustrated compositions are assembled from common objects and scraps of materials, including items which might be associated with the subject (for example, using bologna and liquor bottles to create Boris Yeltsin for Haaretz in 2000).
His caricatures appear in Time, Newsweek, Rolling Stone, The Atlantic Monthly, The Times, and Entertainment Weekly, among other publications.

Awards and recognition
Society of Illustrators Gold Medal (1995)
Society of Publication Designers Silver Medal
Art Directors Club Merit Award for Cover Illustration (1996)
Folio Eddie & Ozzie awards Gold, Best Use of Illustration (2007)
Time magazine, One of Ten in Best Children's Books Of 2004 (for What Presidents Are Made Of
Parents' Choice Silver Award for Faces iMake - Right Brain Creativity (2012) 
Parents' Choice Gold Award for Faces iMake ABC (2013)

Published works
 My Best Friend is as Sharp as a Pencil (2010)
 What Cats are Made Of (2009)
 My Dog Is As Smelly As Dirty Socks (2007)
 What Athletes Are Made Of (2006)
 The Scary Show of Mo and Jo (2005)
 What Presidents Are Made Of (2004)
 The Perfect Purple Feather (2002)
 Faces: 78 Portraits from Madonna to the Pope (2002)

One-man exhibitions
 The Czech Center, Prague (2011)
 Plaza de la Concepción, Caceres, Spain (2011)
 The Skirball Cultural Center, Los Angeles (2010)
 Museo de los Niños, Guatemala City, Guatemala (2007)
 Museo de los Niños, Costa Rica (2007)
 Centro Cultura Judia, São Paulo, Brasil (2006)
 Centro Cultural Recoleta, Buenos Aires, Argentina (2004)
 Galeria Latina, Montevideo, Uruguay (2004)
 Haifa Museum, Israel (2000)
 Ashdod Museum, Israel (1998)
 Kibbutz Ashdot Yaakov, Israel (1997)
 School of Visual Arts, New York City (1992)

See also
Visual arts in Israel

References

External links 

Piven talks at Tedx Jerusalem, 2013
Heflinreps, Inc. - Piven's US agent
Piven's Workshop at Teach for All Global Conference in Bulgaria, 2016

1963 births
Living people
People from Montevideo
Israeli illustrators
Israeli Jews
Uruguayan Jews
Israeli people of Uruguayan-Jewish descent